Ectonucleoside triphosphate diphosphohydrolase 7 is a protein that in humans is encoded by the ENTPD7 gene.

Function

This gene encodes a purine-converting ectoenzyme which belongs to the ecto-nucleoside triphosphate diphosphohydrolase (E-NTPDase) family. The encoded protein hydrolyzes extracellular nucleoside triphosphates (UTP, GTP, and CTP) to nucleoside monophosphates as part of a purinergic signaling pathway. It contains two transmembrane domains at the N- and C-termini and a large, hydrophobic catalytic domain located in between. This gene affects oxidative stress as well as DNA damage and is a mediator of senescence. [provided by RefSeq, Mar 2017].

References

Further reading